Isthmian is the adjective pertaining to an isthmus. 

It may also refer to:

 Isthmian Games, one of the Panhellenic Games of Ancient Greece
 Isthmian League, a regional football league covering London and South East England
 Isthmian script, one of the Mesoamerican writing-systems
 Isthmian Steamship Company, a shipping company
 Isthmian Canal Commission, an American administration commission set up to oversee the construction of the Panama Canal

See also

 Isthmia (disambiguation)
 Isthmus (disambiguation)